Robert A. McColley (born October 14, 1984) is a state senator for the 1st District of the Ohio Senate, which includes Defiance, Hancock, Hardin, Henry, Paulding, Putnam, Van Wert, and Williams counties, as well as parts of Auglaize, Fulton, and Logan counties. McColley graduated from Napoleon High School (Ohio) in 2003 and then went on to attend Ohio State University, where he earned a Bachelor of Science in Business Administration with a major in Finance. He then attended the University of Toledo College of Law and graduated with a Juris Doctor in 2010.

Prior to being appointed to the Senate, he represented the 81st Ohio House District as a State Representative where he also served in House leadership as Assistant Majority Whip.  Before being elected State Representative, he served in the Community Improvement Corporation of Henry County, where he oversaw economic development efforts for the county and worked to improve local workforce development efforts between manufacturers and schools in Henry and Williams counties.

McColley lives in Napoleon with his wife, Denise, their daughter Anna, and their twin boys Matthew and Michael.

In May 2020, during the COVID-19 pandemic, McColley and Senator Kristina Roegner introduced a bill that would immediately end Ohio's stay-at-home order and limit the state health director's ability to give similar orders. The bill is contrary to the recommendation of the country's top medical experts; Governor DeWine has promised to veto any bill that curb's the health director's authority during the crisis.

In 2021, McColley was the lead sponsor on legislation that would make it harder to build solar and wind energy projects in Ohio. Solar and wind energy projects could be killed by local officials, whereas natural gas and oil projects could not.

In 2021, McColley defended a proposed redistricting map for Ohio that was heavily gerrymandered in favor of Republicans.

Committee assignments 
During the 134th General Assembly, McColley was assigned to the following committees:

 (Chair of) Energy and Public Utilities Committee
 (Vice Chair of) Judiciary Committee
 (Vice Chair of) Government Oversight and Reform Committee
 Workforce and Higher Education Committee
 Rules and Reference Committee

References

Links
campaign website
campaign Facebook page

1984 births
21st-century American politicians
Living people
Ohio State University Fisher College of Business alumni
People from Napoleon, Ohio
Republican Party Ohio state senators
University of Toledo College of Law alumni